I, Thighpaulsandra is the debut album by Thighpaulsandra. I showcased Thighpaulsandra's interests in krautrock, experimental and industrial music and featured his only single to date, "Michel Publicity Window". Closing song "Beneath the Frozen Lake of Stars" was originally recorded for a third album by Queen Elizabeth, which featured Thighpaulsandra and Julian Cope, but was revised and expanded for inclusion on this album. The vinyl edition was limited to 1000 copies on "moon's milk" white vinyl, with an additional 55 copies on amethyst-coloured vinyl; this smaller batch, along with being autographed, had its sleeve personally damaged by Thighpaulsandra to the extent that the recipient saw fit.

Track listing

CD pressing

LP pressing

Personnel
 Thighpaulsandra - vocals, piano, hammond organ, vox organ, mellotron, synthesizer, trumpet, French horn, harpsichord, theremin, CS80, electronics, tapes, filters, ring modulators
 Martin Schellard - guitars; bass on "Optical Black" and "Home Butt Club"
 Malcolm Cross - drums on "The Angelica Declaration", "Michel Publicity Window" and "Home Butt Club"; marimba and antique cymbals on "Abuse Foundation IV"
 Dorothy Lewis - vocal on "Lycraland"
 The Boy Anal: VCS3 on "The Angelica Declaration"; drum loop on "Terrible"
 Ray Dickaty - baritone saxophone on "The Angelica Declaration"
 Dave Temple - alto saxophone on "The Angelica Declaration"; clarinet on "Abuse Foundation IV"
 Siôn Orgon - percussion on "The Angelica Declaration"
 Xeno - backing vocals on "The Angelica Declaration" and "We, the Descending"
 John Balance - vocals on "Optical Black"
 Peter Christopherson - computers on "Optical Black"
 Hans-Jürgen Rausch - Tam tam on "Abuse Foundation IV"; vocals and PPG Wave on "Beneath the Frozen Lake of Stars"
 Butros Müller-Stall - Tam tam on "Abuse Foundation IV"; drums on "We, the Descending", "Celine and Julie Go Boating" and "Beneath the Frozen Lake of Stars"; percussion on "Beneath the Frozen Lake of Stars"
 The Maureen Wilson Quartet - strings on "Abuse Foundation IV"
 Michael Mooney - Gibson lap steel guitar on "Michel Publicity Window"
 Simon Norris - water recording of "Nash Point, South Glam" on "Terrible"
 Rolan Nolan - guitar on "Home Butt Club"
 Julian Cope - Doubleneck guitar on "Beneath the Frozen Lake of Stars"

References
2xCD entry at discogs.com
2x12" vinyl entry at discogs.com

Thighpaulsandra albums
2001 debut albums